Mislođin is a village located in the municipality of Obrenovac, Belgrade, Serbia. As of 2011 census, it has a population of 2,424 inhabitants.

History 
The remains belonging to the Scordisci, a Celtic  tribe which founded Singidunum and Taurunum, the predecessors of Belgrade and Zemun, respectively, were found in Mislođin.

It is also the location of the Monastery of Saint Christopher, founded in 1280.

References

Populated places in Serbia